Lu Weiyi may refer to:

 Michael Loewe, Chinese name Lǔ Wéiyī 鲁惟一, British sinologist
 Mark Edward Lewis, Chinese name Lù Wēiyí 陆威仪, American sinologist